Irish Linen Guild is a promotional organization of the Irish linen industry that was founded in 1928. The Guild's main role is to promote Irish linen in national and international markets, through its website.
 
The guild's brand's trademark is the focus of all promotional activities. 
This mark is often colloquially referred to as the 'carpet beater symbol'. It can only be used to mark genuine Irish linen products such as linen yarn spun in Ireland and linen fabrics woven in Ireland by members of the Guild.
 
Products made from genuine Irish linen fabric, such as garments or table linens, can be labelled Irish linen although the made up item may have been assembled elsewhere.

References

External links 
Guild homepage
Irish Linen industry
 Irish Linen - The Fabric of Ireland
  - History of Irish Linen

Woven fabrics
Irish textile organizations
Business organisations based in the Republic of Ireland
Linen industry in Ireland
1928 establishments in Ireland